Conquistadores: Adventvm is a 2017 Spanish historical drama miniseries directed by Israel del Santo for Movistar+ and starring Aitana Sánchez-Gijón, Juan Díaz Pardeiro, Denis Gómez, Miguel Lago and Mauro Muñiz de Urquiza.

It tells the story of the first 30 years of the colonization of the Americas by Christopher Columbus. It was filmed in Brazil, Burgos, Cantabria and Cádiz.

Cast

Seasons

First season

References

External links 
 

2010s Spanish drama television series
2017 Spanish television series debuts
Television series about the history of Spain
Cultural depictions of Christopher Columbus
Cultural depictions of Hernán Cortés
Cultural depictions of Francisco Pizarro
Cultural depictions of Isabella I of Castile
European colonization of the Americas
Television series set in the 15th century
Television series set in the 16th century